White House is an unincorporated community in New Kent County, Virginia, United States, on the south shore of the Pamunkey River. White House Plantation, for which it is named, was the home in the 18th century of Martha Dandridge Custis, who as a widow, there courted her future husband, Colonel George Washington. They were married in 1759.

Nearby, White House Landing on the river was the site of a major Union Army supply base in 1862 during the Peninsula Campaign and again in 1864 during the Overland Campaign of the American Civil War. At White House, the Richmond and York River Railroad, which was completed in 1861 between Richmond and West Point, crossed the Pamunkey River. The railroad is now part of the Norfolk Southern rail system.

References

Unincorporated communities in New Kent County, Virginia
Unincorporated communities in Virginia